Maggie Valley is a town in Haywood County, North Carolina, United States. The population was 1,150 at the 2010 census. A popular tourist destination, it is home to Cataloochee Ski Area and the former Ghost Town in the Sky amusement park. Maggie Valley is part of the Asheville Metropolitan Statistical Area.

The community gets its name from Maggie Mae Setzer; her father John "Jack" Sidney Setzer founded the area's first post office and named it after one of his daughters.

History
Before European colonization, what is now Maggie Valley was inhabited by the Cherokee people and other Indigenous peoples for thousands of years. The Cherokee in Western North Carolina are known as the Eastern Band of Cherokee Indians, a federally recognized tribe.

Maggie Valley was officially incorporated as a town on May 10, 1904.

Geography
Maggie Valley is in west-central Haywood County at  (35.514430, -83.067013). U.S. Route 19 is the main road through the town, leading east  to Asheville and west over Soco Gap  to Cherokee.

Wildlife

Elk were copious throughout the United States, but numbers have decreased since the mid-1800s because of overhunting and habitat loss. In 2001, the Rocky Mountain Elk Foundation, the National Park Service and other partners joined together to restore wild elk to the Smoky Mountains in the Cataloochee Valley near Maggie Valley. Most elk are found in Cataloochee Valley, which is a perfect viewing area in the southeastern section of the Great Smoky Mountains National Park. But the elk have been known to wander out of the park and walk toward Maggie Valley. The best times to view elk are in the early morning and late evening.

Not only are there elk around Maggie Valley, but occasionally there are black bears. Bears are found in the Great Smoky Mountains National Park and occasionally in the areas around Maggie Valley. During winter, the black bears are inactive for a short amount of time and exhibit some physiological responses to low food storage and temperatures. But a result of their brief hibernation is that there are more bear sightings. This is risky because they can be looking for food in neighborhoods or killed on roads. Locals strongly suggest never approaching a bear to photograph it, or leaving food or garbage out, and taking in any bird feeders that are not monitored (especially at night).

Demographics

2020 census

As of the 2020 United States census, there were 1,687 people, 833 households, and 562 families residing in the town.

2000 census
As of the census of 2000, there were 607 people, 297 households, and 179 families residing in the town. The population density was 372.8 people per square mile (143.8/km2). There were 565 housing units at an average density of 347.0 per square mile (133.8/km2). The racial makeup of the town was 96.38% White, 1.32% African American, 0.66% Native American, 0.66% Asian, 0.16% from other races, and 0.82% from two or more races. Hispanic or Latino of any race were 0.16% of the population.

There were 297 households, of which 16.8% had children under the age of 18 living with them, 52.2% were married couples living together, 6.4% had a female householder with no husband present, and 39.7% were non-families. 33.0% of all households were made up of individuals, and 11.8% had someone living alone who was 65 years of age or older. The average household size was 2.04 and the average family size was 2.56.

In the town, the population was spread out, with 14.0% under age 18, 5.1% from 18 to 24, 23.2% from 25 to 44, 33.8% from 45 to 64, and 23.9% who were 65 or older. The median age was 49. For every 100 females, there were 92.1 males. For every 100 females 18 and over, there were 89.8 males.

The median income for a household in the town was $29,808, and the median income for a family was $40,417. Males had a median income of $27,813 versus $20,865 for females. The per capita income for the town was $17,211. About 9.8% of families and 11.7% of the population were below the poverty line, including 15.2% of those under age 18 and 10.7% of those age 65 or over.

Notable people and events

Society for the Preservation of Bluegrass Music in America (SPGMA) “Hall of Greats" member Raymond Fairchild. 

Maggie Valley is the birthplace of legendary moonshiner Marvin "Popcorn" Sutton.

Elk were reintroduced into the Great Smoky Mountains National Park near Maggie Valley in 2001.

References

External links
 Town of Maggie Valley official website
 Haywood County visitors website
 Maggie Valley Chamber of Commerce

Asheville metropolitan area
1904 establishments in North Carolina
Communities of the Great Smoky Mountains
Towns in Haywood County, North Carolina
Towns in North Carolina